Boly may refer to:

 Bóly District, Hungary
 Bóly, a town and the district seat
 Boľ (Hungarian: Boly), a village and municipality in Slovakia
 Richard Boly, American diplomat
 Willy Boly (born 1991), French footballer
 Yéro Boly (born 1954), Burkinabé politician

See also

 
 Boley (disambiguation)
 Bolly (disambiguation)